Illusions II: The Adventures of a Reluctant Student is the 2014 novel by writer and pilot Richard Bach.  The first Illusions book was published in 1977 and was an international best-seller, telling the story of a pilot who encounters a messiah who has absconded from the "job" of being a messiah.  (Illusions: The Adventures of a Reluctant Messiah was the author's follow-up to 1970's Jonathan Livingston Seagull.)  The sequel is in author Bach's own voice, as his "imaginary" literary characters help him in his recovery from his real-life plane crash.

Plot
After decades of flying without incident, author Richard Bach is near-fatally injured in a horrific plane crash.  The injuries leave him hospital-bound for months, where he delves into the "imaginary" world of his literary creations, and uses them as inspiration to heal his body, mind, and soul.

See also
 Simulated reality
 Simulated reality in fiction

References 

2014 American novels
American philosophical novels
Aviation novels
Works by Richard Bach
Dell Publishing books